Quinten van den Berg (born ), known professionally as Quintino, is a Dutch DJ and record producer. Notable releases include a remix of "Rap das Armas", "Selecta", "Go Hard" and "Fatality". In 2019 he was named No. 25 in the Top 100 DJs list put out by DJ Magazine.

Music career
At the age of 18, Quintino was discovered by Dutch DJ Laidback Luke, who assisted him developing a career. His breakthrough followed in 2011 with his remix of stairs hit "Rap Das Armas" in the Netherlands, and the release of Epic. That same year Quintino co-produced the Afrojack track "Selecta". In 2013 he worked with DJs Tiësto and Alvaro to produce the anthem of Ultra Music Festival. In August, he launched his radio show on Radio SupersoniQ international station SiriusXM's Electric Area.

In 2014, Quintino produced tracks like "Go Hard", "Slammer", "Fatality", "Genesis" and a remix of R3hab & Trevor Guthrie's hit "Soundwave". In 2014 Quintino performed on larger stages, growing from a support act to a headliner. He made his debut in the DJ Mag Top 100 DJs in 2014, at the 86th position. His ranking has since risen in consecutive years, and was consequently ranked 25th in 2019.

Awards and nominations

Discography

Studio albums

Extended plays

Singles

Remixes
2011: LMFAO — "Champagne Showers" (Quintino Remix)
2011: Pitbull featuring Marc Anthony — "Rain Over Me" (Quintino Remix)
2012: Pitbull — "Back In Time" (from "Men In Black 3") (Quintino Remix)
2012: Lady Gaga — "Marry The Night" (Quintino Remix)
2013: Example - “All the Wrong Places” (Quintino Remix)
2017: J Balvin and Willy William — "Mi Gente" (Hardwell & Quintino Remix)
2020: Regard — "Ride It" (Dimitri Vegas & Like Mike and Quintino Remix)
2020: Tiësto and Vintage Culture — "Coffee (Give Me Something)" (Quintino Remix)
2021: Illenium, Valerie Broussard, and Nurko — "Sideways" (Quintino Remix)

Notes
 A  "You Know What" did not enter the Single Top 100, but peaked at number 10 on the Dutch Top 40 chart.
 B  "Dynamite" did not enter the Single Top 100, but peaked at number 16 on the Dutch Dance chart.
 C  "Escape (Into the Sunset)" did not enter the Single Top 100, but peaked at number 3 on the Dutch Dance chart.
 D  "Escape (Into the Sunset)" did not enter the Ultratop 50, but peaked at number 84 on the Flemish Ultratip chart.

References

External links
 
 

1985 births
Dutch dance musicians
Dutch DJs
Dutch record producers
Electronic dance music DJs
Living people
People from Den Helder
Remixers
Progressive house musicians